Hungary women's national floorball team is the national team of Hungary. At the 2001 Floorball Women's World Championship in Riga, Latvia, the team finished seventh in the B-Division. At the 2003 Floorball Women's World Championship in Germany, the team finished ninth in the B-Division. At the 2005 Floorball Women's World Championship in Singapore, the team finished sixth in the B-Division. At the 2007 Floorball Women's World Championship in Frederikshavn, Denmark, the team finished third in the B-Division. At the 2013 Floorball Women's World Championship in Brno and Ostrava, Czech Republic, the team finished fourteenth.

References 

Women's national floorball teams
Floorball